The 1899 Michigan State Normal Normalites football team represented Michigan State Normal College (later renamed Eastern Michigan University) during the 1899 college football season.  In their first and only season under head coach Dwight Watson, the Normalites compiled a record of 1–1–1 and outscored their opponents by a combined total of 29 to 23. George L. Wood was the team captain. They played the University of Michigan freshman team to 5-5 tie, lost to Michigan Agricultural College by an 18-0 score, and defeated the Toledo YMCA team, 24-0.

Schedule

References

Michigan State Normal
Eastern Michigan Eagles football seasons
Michigan State Normal Normalites football